Norouzi is an Iranian surname. Notable people with the surname include:

 Afshin Norouzi, Iranian table tennis player
 Hadi Norouzi, Iranian footballer
 Kambiz Norouzi, Iranian lawyer
 Mahtab Norouzi, Iranian Baluchi master artisan in needlework
 Reza Norouzi, Iranian footballer
 Reza Fieze Norouzi, Iranian actor

Iranian-language surnames